Paraiso Tour is a concert tour by Spanish singer Alejandro Sanz as promoting his album Paraíso Express.

Tour set list

 Mi Peter Punk
 Viviendo Deprisa
 Lo Que Fui Es lo Que Soy
 Desde Cuándo
 Nuestro Amor Será Leyenda
 Se le Apagó la Luz
 Cuando Nadie Me Ve
 Corazón Partío
 Yo Hice Llorar Hasta a Los Ángeles
 Si Hay Dios...
 Sin Que Se Note
 Lola Soledad
 Quisiera Ser
 Y, ¿Si Fuera Ella?
 Looking For Paradise
 Yo Sé lo Que la Gente Piensa
 ¿Lo Ves?
 Tú No Tienes la Culpa
 Tu Letra Podré Acariciar
 Aquello Que Me Diste
 A la Primera Persona
 Mi Soledad y Yo
 Amiga Mía
 No Es lo Mismo

Tour dates

Box office score data (Billboard)

Band 

 Alejandro sanz – Vocal and guitar
 Mike Ciro – Musical Director and guitar
 Alfonso Perez – Keyboards
 Charles Martin – Percussion
 Chris Hierro – Keyboards, Backing vocal
 Nathaniel Townsley – Drums
 Aramanda Sabal – Bass
 Jan Ozveren – Guitar
 Sara Devine – Backing vocal
 Txell Sust – Backing vocal

References

External links 
 Web oficial de Alejandro Sanz

2009 concert tours
2010 concert tours
2011 concert tours
Alejandro Sanz